Kohala is the name of the northwest portion of the island of Hawaii in the Hawaiian Archipelago. In ancient Hawaii it was often ruled by an independent High Chief called the Alii Nui. In modern times it is divided into two districts of Hawaii County: North Kohala and South Kohala. Locals commonly use the name Kohala to refer to the census-designated places of Halaula, Hāwī, and Kapaau collectively. The dry western shore is commonly known as the Kohala Coast, which has golf courses and seaside resorts.

Description

The area was named after the dominating geological feature Kohala Mountain, the oldest of Hawaii Island's five major volcanic mountains. The current districts cover the north and western sides of the mountain, .
It was one of the five ancient divisions of the island called moku.

The natural habitats in Kohala range across a wide rainfall gradient in a very short distance - from less than  a year on the coast near Kawaihae to more than  year near the summit of Kohala Mountain, a distance of just . Near the coast are remnants of dry forests, and near the summit is a cloud forest, a type of rainforest that obtains some of its moisture from "cloud drip" in addition to precipitation.

This precipitation allowed the northeast coast to be developed into sugarcane plantations, including one founded by Rev. Elias Bond used to fund his church and girls' seminary.

History

Kohala Historical Sites State Monument
The Kohala Historical Sites State Monument includes Mookini Heiau, a  National Historic Landmark.  King Kamehameha I, the first King of the unified Hawaiian Islands, was born in North Kohala west of Hāwī, at the ancient site called the Mookini Heiau. The heiau is a living spiritual temple, and not just an historic artifact of the Hawaiian culture.

The original Kamehameha Statue stands in front of the community center in Kapaau, and duplicates are found at Aliiolani Hale in Honolulu, and within the U.S. Capitol building's statue gallery in Washington, D.C.

Bond Historic District
The Bond Historic District is located in the North Kohala District, with structures from the Bond family's 19th century missionary and homesteading period on the Kohala peninsula. The Bond District has three sections: 
Bond Homestead — the Bond House was built in the 1840s by the missionaries and later Kohala landowners Ellen and Reverend Elias Bond, and expanded by descendants through c. 1900.
Kalahikiola Church
Kohala Seminary

Attractions
Points of interest within Kohala include Hapuna Beach State Recreation Area, Samuel Spencer Beach, Puukoholā Heiau National Historic Site, Lapakahi State Historical Park and Keokea Beach Park.

Transportation

Major thoroughfares within Kohala include Akoni Pule Highway (Hawaii state route 270) which provides access to Pololū Valley. The Hawaii Belt Road which connects in the southern end of the Akoni Pule Highway to Kona in the south and Hāmākua to the east. The Kohala Mountain Road (250) provides a link between Waimea and the Kohala CDP's of Halaʻula, Hāwī, and Kapaʻau.

Kohala has two small airports. Upolu Airport is on Upolu Point at the northern tip of the island. Waimea-Kohala Airport is south of the town of Waimea, Hawaii County, Hawaii. Waimea Airport is served commercially by Mokulele Airlines.

Populations of Kohala

North Kohala

Census-designated places of North Kohala 
 Halaula
 Hāwī
 Kapaau

South Kohala

Census-designated places of South Kohala 
 Puako
 Waikoloa Village
 Waimea

Unincorporated towns of South Kohala 
 Kawaihae

Notable residents 
Auliʻi Cravalho, actress and singer

See also 
 The Fairmont Orchid
 Mauna Kea Beach Hotel

References

External links 

 Kohala Gallery

Districts of Hawaii County, Hawaii
Geography of Hawaii (island)